The Novo Basquete Brasil awards (English: New Basketball Brazil awards) are the yearly individual awards that are given by Brazil's top-tier level men's professional club basketball league, the Novo Basquete Brasil (NBB) (New Basketball Brazil).

NBB MVP
The NBB MVP is a New Basket Brazil award given to the best performing player of the season. It has been given since the first season of the Brazilian league, in 2009. The greatest winner is the forward Marcelinho Machado, with two consecutive awards. The award is given at the end of the season, at the wrap party of the championship, one day after the final game. Before the event, three candidates are announced and during the event the winner is chosen.

NBB Finals MVP
The NBB Finals MVP is the MVP award of the final playoff series of the top professional basketball league in Brazil, the NBB. The award has been given out since the 2010–11 NBB season. In the 2018–19 season, the award started being sponsored by Budweiser and called Troféu Amaury Pasos de MVP Bud das Finais, in honor of legendary player and former  FIBA Basketball World Cup MVP, Amaury Pasos.

NBB Defender of the Year
The NBB Defender of the Year is a New Basket Brazil award given since the 2009 NBB season to the top defensive player of the season. The winner of the award in all of the 6 times that it was given so far is the shooting guard Alex Garcia, who won the award six times.
The award is given at the end of the season, at the wrap party of the championship, one day after the final game. Before the event, three candidates are announced and during the event the winner is chosen.

NBB Sixth Man of the Year
The NBB Sixth Man of the Year is a New Basket Brazil award, given since the NBB 2009 to the most valuable substitute player, called sixth man. The award is given at the end of the season, at the wrap party of the championship, one day after the final game. Before the event, three candidates are announced and during the event the winner is chosen.

NBB Most Improved Player
The NBB Most Improved Player is a New Basket Brazil award given since the 2009–10 to the most improved player of the season. The award is given at the end of the season, at the wrap party of the championship, one day after the final game. Before the event, three candidates are announced and during the event the winner is chosen.

NBB Revelation Player
The NBB Revelation Player is a New Basket Brazil award given since the 2009–10 NBB season to the player considered the greatest discovery of the season. Normally the award is given to player who attended the NBB Under-22, also called Liga de Desenvolvimento de Basquete, but this is not a rule. The first two awards were not given to players from NBB Under-22. The award is given at the end of the season, at the wrap party of the championship, one day after the final game. Before the event, three candidates are announced and during the event the winner is chosen.

NBB Best Foreign Player

NBB "Craque da Galera" (Fan's Player of the Year)

All-NBB Team

NBB Ary Vidal Trophy Coach of the Year
The NBB Troféu Ary Vidal (NBB Ary Vidal Trophy) Coach of the Year is a New Basket Brazil award, given since the NBB 2009 to the best head coach of the season. The trophy given to the winner is called Ary Vidal Trophy, in a tribute to one of the greatest Brazilian coaches in history. Before the event, three candidates are announced and during the event the winner is chosen.

References

External links
New Basketball Brazil's official website 
New Basketball Brazil at Latinbasket.com

awards
Brazil